Ganges Bank is a wholly submerged atoll structure in the Southwest of the Chagos Archipelago. It is about 7 by 5 km in size, yielding an area of about 30 km.

References

External links
Indian Ocean Pilot
Pub.171 Sailing Directions E. Africa and S. Indian Ocean

Chagos Archipelago